Jean-Pierre Antonios (born 30 January 1965 in Kuwait) is a Finnish-Kuwaiti Paralympic archer who competes at international archery competitions. He is a World champion and double European champion in the compound bow.

Antonios was a militant for the Lebanese Forces until the late 1980s then emigrated to Finland as an asylum seeker in 1990. He visited his home nation of Lebanon in 1997, on his way to the country, he contracted campylobacter which resulted in his central nervous system get destroyed and was diagnosed with Gullain Barré syndrome. He returned to Finland and was put on a ventilator for three months, he spent a total of thirteen months in the hospital and he used a wheelchair since then.

In 2000, he was granted Finnish citizenship and also took up archery then competed internationally in 2002. He has competed at four Paralympic Games, his highest achievement was in his debut Games at the 2004 Summer Paralympics and 2012 Summer Paralympics where he reached the quarterfinals in the individual compound.

References

1965 births
Living people
Sportspeople from Turku
Finnish male archers
Paralympic archers of Finland
Archers at the 2004 Summer Paralympics
Archers at the 2008 Summer Paralympics
Archers at the 2012 Summer Paralympics
Archers at the 2016 Summer Paralympics